Svetlana Kuznetsova was the defending champion, but withdrew due to a groin strain.Agnieszka Radwańska won the title, defeating Vera Zvonareva 6–3, 6–4 in the final.

Seeds
The top eight seeds received a bye into the second round.

Qualifying

Draw

Finals

Top half

Section 1

Section 2

Bottom half

Section 3

Section 4

External links
 Main draw

Mercury Insurance Open - Singles